Pruszcz Gdański (former) is a town in Pomerania, northern Poland with 26,834 inhabitants (2010). Pruszcz Gdański is an industrial town neighbouring Gdańsk, part of the Tricity agglomeration. The Tricity Bypass begins in Pruszcz Gdański.

The capital of Gdańsk County in the Pomeranian Voivodeship since 1999, previously in the Gdańsk Voivodeship from 1975 to 1998. The town is served by a railway station.

History 

The town was first mentioned with its German name 'Prust' founded by the Teutonic Knights. It belonged to the State of the Teutonic Order til 1454. The following Polish administration during the period of autonomous Royal Prussia employed the name Pruszcz until the town became part of the Kingdom of Prussia as the result of the Partitions of Poland. 

Til 1920 Praust was part of Germany. Unlike most of Eastern Pomerania, the Germanspeaking Lutheran town did not fall to Poland after regaining independence, but was included in the German-speaking Free City of Danzig by the Treaty of Versailles. During World War II, Praust was the location of a female subcamp of the Stutthof concentration camp.

As early as 30 March 1945, the Polish Post Office began its work as the first post-war Polish institution in the town. In post-war Poland the adjective Gdański was added to the town's name, after the nearby city of Gdańsk, to distinguish the town from other Polish settlements of the same name.

Education 
Schools:
 Zespół Szkół Ogólnokształcących nr 1
 Liceum Ogólnokształcące
 Gimnazjum nr 1
 Szkoła Podstawowa nr 2 w Pruszczu Gdańskim - School website 
 Szkoła Podstawowa nr 3
 Zespół Szkół nr 4
 Katolickie Szkoły Niepubliczne im. Jana Pawła II - School website 
 Prywatna Szkoła Muzyczna I stopnia

Preschools:
 Przedszkole Publiczne nr 3
 Niepubliczne Przedszkole im. Janusza Korczaka
 Niepubliczne Przedszkole „Promyczek”
 Oddziały Przedszkolne Szkoły Podstawowej nr 2 „Dwójeczka”
 Niepubliczne Przedszkole „Jedyneczka”
 Niepubliczne przedszkole „Czwóreczka”

Population

Sports 

The clubs local football club is Czarni Pruszcz Gdański.

Notable people 
 Edward Jurkiewicz (born 1948 in Pruszcz Gdański) a Polish former professional basketball player, competed in the 1968 Summer Olympics
 Mateusz Bąk (born 1983 in Pruszcz Gdański) a Polish footballer who currently played for Lechia Gdańsk as a goalkeeper.

See also 
 Battle of Pruszcz Gdański

References

External links 
Municipal website 
photos from Pruszcz Gdański 

Cities and towns in Pomeranian Voivodeship
Gdańsk County